Bapara is a genus of snout moths. It was described by Francis Walker in 1865 and is known from Australia and New Guinea.

Species
 Bapara agasta (Turner, 1911)
 Bapara obliterosa Walker, 1865
 Bapara pandana Whalley, 1964
 Bapara paynei Whalley, 1964

References

Tirathabini
Pyralidae genera